The Boston Grammar School is a selective grammar school and sixth form college for boys aged 11 to 18 and girls attending the sixth form aged 16–18 located in Boston, Lincolnshire, England.

A recent 2021 Ofsted report assessed the school overall as 'good'

History
The school was founded by charter of Philip and Mary in 1555. The oldest sections of the school were built in 1567, formerly referred to as the "big school" and is now used as the school library. South End Site became the model for Boston Latin School which was the first school in what was to become the United States of America. The school still retains the Latin motto 'Floreat Bostona' (May Boston Flourish). This motto also forms the title of the official school song, written by Dr G.E. Pattenden, headmaster from 1850–1887, which he referred to as 'my school hymn'. The song is still sung at official school occasions such as Prizegiving, Charter Day and Beastmart.

In the 1960s when under Holland County Council Education Committee, it was a voluntary controlled school with around 620 boys. The school had a CCF.

Girls are now admitted to the sixth form. There were 597 pupils on the roll as at April 2008, including 170 in the sixth form. The school has been awarded Technology College and Sports specialist status. In December 2012, Boston Grammar School shut its doors for the final time as a selective school, run by the local authority. In January 2013, Boston Grammar School re-opened as a selective academy.

Academy status
On 1 January 2013, Boston Grammar School became a converter academy, under the leadership of the then headteacher, Mr Paul Marsh. No changes were made to the school uniform and the school retained its existing name. This ended the federation between Boston Grammar School and Boston High School, with both schools now having an independent governing body, budget and establishment number.

Federation plans
In 2006, there were controversial plans by Lincolnshire County Council to federate Boston Grammar School with the local girls grammar school Boston High School, with effect from September 2011. In 2010 it was announced that due to the withdrawal of Building Schools for the Future funding by the new coalition government, that both schools would operate as two separate schools, still under a federation - on two sites - with one governing body. This arrangement ended when Boston Grammar School became an Academy in 2013.

Traditions

Houses
There are four houses in the school named after important figures in the school's history. Each is associated with a different colour which is reflected in PE shirts, and boys are assigned to a house when they join the school on an arbitrary basis in order to create different groups for school activities, including Sports Day.

Laughton – (yellow), John Laughton left a bequest to the local bluecoats' school. On its closure this was subsequently given to the grammar school. Head of House: Miss Amanda Cook;

Muston – (blue),  Robert De Muston was the first schoolmaster of Boston in 1329. Head of House: Mr Alan Mountford;

Gannock – (red), William Gannock was the Mayor of Boston at the time the school was built on its current site in 1567. Head of House: Miss Christine Abrams;

Parry – (green), John Parry the Liberal MP for Boston who in 1875 gave a gold medal to the scholar of the year. This medal is still awarded to the student who attains the best A-level results each year. Head of House: Miss Louise Brown.

Beast Mart
Beast Mart is an annual half-day holiday, awarded to boys to commemorate the annual cattle market that took place traditionally in the school yard (the Beast Yard). The Beast Mart declaration takes place one day in December each year. The Council Chief Executive (in place of the historical Town Clerk) reads the declaration of the Beast Mart and the Mayor requests that the headmaster give the school a half-day holiday. The head of school then leads three cheers to the King and  the Mayor calling "hip, hip, hip!"

Charter Day
A celebration of the granting of the school charter takes place annually at St Botolph's Church, Boston, (known locally as Boston Stump). During this celebration the school song is traditionally sung.

Prizegiving
An annual prizegiving ceremony is held in December of each year. During this event a number of awards recognising achievement in academic disciplines, sport and other areas are awarded. Old boys are often in attendance, including the previous year's A-level students who return to receive their A-level certificates. The prestigious Parry Gold Medal is awarded to the student who achieved the best A-level results. A guest speaker is always invited, and notable guests of honour have included Helen Sharman, Barry Spikings and Mark Simmonds MP.

Controversies

Reports of violence towards a student (2004) 
On 17 December, 2004, it was reported that an act of violence was committed by a teacher towards a student. According to reports, Richard Anderson aggressively threw a bag at a 13-year-old pupil after asking them to leave the classroom. The bag hit the student in the back of the head and had to wear a neckbrace upon their return to school. On November 11, 2004, Richard Anderson was dismissed from the school, only to return in January 2005 following a sit-down protest organised by students of the school, which caused the premises to be shut down for two days.

Notable former pupils

 
 George Bass – surgeon and explorer (likely)
 Cyril Bland – cricketer
 Brian Bolland – comics artist 
 Richard Budge – former head of RJB Mining
 Joseph Langley Burchnall – mathematician
 Danny Butterfield – footballer
 Bernard Codd – professional motorcycle road racer
 John Cridland – former Director General of the Confederation of British Industry
 Bill Dunham – former Deputy Commandant General of the Royal Marines
 Victor Emery – physicist
 George Edward Hale Enderby – anaesthetist, who developed Hypotensive anaesthesia using an Oscillotonometer to measure low blood pressure
 Simon Garner – footballer (Blackburn Rovers F.C.)
 Arthur James Grant – historian
 John Hallam – Canon of Windsor
 Wyn Harness (1971–8) – former assistant editor, and a founder of The Independent
 Michael Horne FRS, structural engineer
 Carl Hudson – Musician (Keyboard player for Professor Green)
 Richard Hurst – writer and director
 John Leverett – former governor of Massachusetts (likely)
 Rev Dr John Newton CBE – former president of the Methodist Conference, former President of The Wesley Historical Society
 T. William Olle – computer scientist
 Simon Patrick – Bishop of Ely from 1691–1707
 Mike Pinner – footballer (Manchester United F.C.)
 Philip Priestley (1957–64) – former High Commissioner to Belize (2001–4)
 Oliver Ryan – footballer (ex Lincoln City footballer)
 Rt Rev Frank Pilkington Sargeant – Bishop at Lambeth from 1994-9 and Bishop of Stockport from 1984–94
 Barry Spikings – Hollywood producer
 Ernest Stewart Roberts, Vice-Chancellor from 1906-08 of the University of Cambridge
 Ray Tinkler – football referee
 Jonathan Van-Tam MBE (1976–82) – Deputy Chief Medical Officer for England
 David Ward – former Lib Dem MP for Bradford East (2010–2015)
 Oswald Wardell-Yerburgh – clergyman
 Scott Williams – professional darts player

Notable staff
James Dyson, headmaster 1912–1919

See also
List of the oldest schools in the world

References

External links 

 Boston Grammar School
 Boston High School
 Old Bostonian Association — including much historical information

News items
 Telegraph October 2008
 Telegraph December 2006
 Federation plan in July 2006

Educational institutions established in the 1550s
Grammar schools in Lincolnshire
1555 establishments in England
Boys' schools in Lincolnshire
Schools in Boston, Lincolnshire
Academies in Lincolnshire